Leonce-und-Lena-Preis is a literary prize of Hesse. The award was founded in 1968, the City of Darmstadt has been awarding the prize since 1979. Leonce and Lena is a play by Georg Büchner. The prize money is €8,000. German-speaking authors who were not older than 35 can take part.

Winners

 1968 Wolf Wondratschek
 1969 Katrine von Hutten
 1972 Hanne F. Juritz
 1973 Harry Oberländer
 1975 Rita Breit
 1977 Friederike Roth und Anno F. Leven
 1979 Ludwig Fels, Rolf Haufs und Rainer Malkowski
 1981 Ulla Hahn, Förderpreis Tina Stroheker
 1983 not awarded
 1985 Hans-Ulrich Treichel
 1987 Jan Koneffke, Sonderpreis "Politisches Gedicht": Richard Wagner
 1989 Kurt Drawert
 1991 Kerstin Hensel
 1993 Kathrin Schmidt
 1995 Raoul Schrott
 1997 Dieter M. Gräf
 1999 Raphael Urweider
 2001 Silke Scheuermann, Sabine Scho
 2003 Anja Utler
 2005 Ron Winkler
 2007 Christian Schloyer
 2009 Ulrike Almut Sandig
 2011 Steffen Popp
 2013 Katharina Schultens
 2015 David Krause
 2017 Andra Schwarz
 2019 Yevgeniy Breyger
 2021 Katrin Pitz

References

External links
 

Literary awards of Hesse